Creation Rebel is a 2004 compilation album by reggae artist Burning Spear.

Track listing
"Door Peeper"
"This Race"
"This Population"
"Bad to Worst"
"New Civilization"
"Pick Up The Pieces"
"Zion Higher"
"Swell Headed"
"Foggy Road"
"Creation Rebel"
"Ethiopians Live It Out"
"Rocking Time"
"Get Ready"
"What a Happy Day"
"Call on You"
"Free" (aka We Are Free)
"Down by the River" (aka Down by the Riverside)
"Weeping and Wailing"
"He Prayed"
"Rocking Time" (Original Single Mix)
"He Prayed / Joe Frazier" (Part 2) w/Dennis Alcapone (Single) - LP only
"Rocking Time / Pepper Rock w/Prince Jazzbo" (Single) - LP only

Musician
Winston Rodney – lead vocals, harmony vocals
Fil Callender – drums, guitar
Leroy "Horsemouth" Wallace – drums
Boris Gardiner – bass
Earl "Bagga" Walker – bass
Leroy Sibbles – bass
Carlton Manning – bass, guitar
Eric Frater – guitar
Patrick McDonald – guitar
Albert Griffiths – guitar
Ernest Ranglin – guitar
Robbie Lyn – keyboards
Richard Ace – keyboards
Denzil Laing – percussion
Enid Cumberland – percussion
Cedric Brooks – horns
David Madden – horns
Vincent Gordon – horns
Hedley Bennett – horns
Jo Jo Bennett – horns
Larry Marshall – harmony vocals (tracks 2 and 5)
Rupert Willington – harmony vocals (tracks 1, 6, 7, 11 and 16)
Al Campbell – harmony vocals (track 3)
Clement Dodd – DJ (track 20)

References

2004 compilation albums
Burning Spear compilation albums